FANatic is an American TV show created by Ed Connolly and produced by Executive Producers Deborah Norton and Ed Connolly of Norton Connolly Productions, that was shown on the MTV network in the late 1990s. It featured everyday people being tricked into going somewhere and unexpectedly meeting their idol (musician, actor, etc.).

Episode list

Season 1

Season 2

Season 3

Season 4

Season 5

References

MTV original programming
1998 American television series debuts
2000 American television series endings
1990s American reality television series
2000s American reality television series